The following is a list of Cornell Big Red men's basketball head coaches. There have been 22 head coaches of the Big Red in their 124-season history.

Cornell's current head coach is Brian Earl. He was hired as the Big Red's head coach in April 2016, replacing Bill Courtney, whose contract was not renewed after the 2015–16 season.

References

Cornell

Cornell Big Red men's basketball coaches